Yuen Long District (formerly romanised as Un Long) is one of the districts of Hong Kong. Located in the northwest of the New Territories, it had a population of 662,000 in 2021

Geography

Yuen Long District contains the largest alluvial plain in Hong Kong, the Yuen Long-Kam Tin plain. With an area of 144 km2, the district covers many traditional villages including Ping Shan Heung, Ha Tsuen Heung, Kam Tin Heung, Fung Kat Heung, Pat Heung, San Tin Heung and Shap Pat Heung, as well as Yuen Long Town and Tin Shui Wai.

Two new towns have been developed within this district. Yuen Long New Town was developed from the traditional market town of Yuen Long Town from the late 1970s. Tin Shui Wai New Town has developed since the early 1990s, and is built on land reclaimed from former fish ponds once common in the district.

History
According to archaeological findings, there were inhabitants settled in the district around 3,500 years ago. The ruling clan of the Tang Clan lived there in Kam Tin. Like Tai Po, Yuen Long used to be a traditional market town.

In 1898 the area of the modern day Yuen Long District was leased to the colonial British Hong Kong government by the Convention for the Extension of Hong Kong Territory. A 6 days war was broke out between the British army and the militia from Tang and other villages. The iron doors of the walled villages of Tang were looted to UK as spoils of war. They are returned to Tang later, but according to urban legends, the mixed up which doors belongs to which walled villages, nowadays the two sides of the door of Kat Hing Wai are not identical in design.

After the war, the colonial government had established a different approach to administrate the New Territories, which established the district office. Yuen Long was under the District Office North headquartered in Tai Po. A branch office was later stationed in Yuen Long permanently.

A reform was held in 1980s that not only the New Territories has their District Offices, but whole HK is grid into Districts, with formal election was held for the councillors of the District Councils. The latest election of the Yuen Long District Council was held in 2019 and scheduled to be held again in 2023.

Culture

Special festivals
The Tin Hau Festival is on the 23rd of the third month of the lunar calendar. It celebrates the birth of a local deity, Tin Hau. During the day, residents from various walled villages set off at Fung Cheung Road, go via Kau Yuk Road and the Yuen Long Stadium, and end at Tai Shu Ha Tin Hau Temple, which has a 300-year history.

Cuisine
 Poon choi
 Sweetheart cake

Popular scenic spots

Hong Kong Wetland Park

Hong Kong Wetland Park is located at the northern part of Tin Shui Wai. It was intended to be an ecological mitigation area (EMA) for the wetlands lost due to Tin Shui Wai New Town development. In 1998, a project named as "International Wetland Park and Visitor Centre Feasibility Study" was initiated by the Agriculture, Fisheries and Conservation Department and the Hong Kong Tourism Board with a view to expanding the EMA to a wetland ecotourism attraction. After concluding that it was feasible to develop a wetland park at the EMA site without compromising its intended ecological mitigation functions and the development of the Wetland Park will also enhance the ecological function of the EMA to a world-class conservation, education and tourism facility, the concerned parties started the Wetland Park Project, which is regarded as one of the Millennium projects by the Administrations.

Kat Hing Wai

Kat Hing Wai in Kam Tin is one of the Yuen Long's best-known walled villages. It is the ancestral home of the Tangs, one of the "Five Great Clans" in the territory. Built by the Tangs 500 years ago, it is a rectangular walled village with an area of 100 metres by 90 metres. As a family stronghold, Kat Hing Wai has served the Tangs well through centuries. In the Qing Dynasty, a five-metre high blue brick wall and four cannon towers were added to defend bandits.

Route: Tuen Ma line Kam Sheung Road station or KMB routes 54, 64K and 77K

Nam Sang Wai

Nam Sang Wai covers a roughly triangular area. It is bordered by the Shan Pui River in the west, separating it from Yuen Long Industrial Estate, the Kam Tin River in the east and a branch of the Kam Tin River in the south. It is home to many birds, including seagulls, Northern Pintails (Anas acuta), Yellow-nib Ducks (Anas poecilorhyncha) and Black-faced Spoonbills (Platalea minor). Flora includes reeds and mangroves.

Mai Po Marshes
Mai Po Marshes is located in the centre of the wetland and has achieved international significance as a stopping and feeding place for migratory birds along the East Asian-Australian Flyway. The birdwatching season runs from October to May and more than 300 types of birds have been recorded in the area, many of them are rarely seen anywhere outside the region.

Visitors may go to Mai Po via the following ways:
 From Central or Causeway Bay take route 968 to Yuen Long (West) Bus terminal, then change taxi.
 From Sheung Shui station, take Bus 76K or red minibus 17 to Mai Po village, then walk to the Marsh (about 20 minutes).

On 30 January 2004, the government suspended public visits to the Mai Po wetland reserve as a supposed measure to protect people from the avian flu (H5N1).

Ping Shan Heritage Trail

Ping Shan Heritage Trail, inaugurated on 12 December 1993, was designed to link several historic buildings and monuments owned by the Tang clan in Ping Shan (including Tsui Sing Lau Pagoda 聚星樓 and Tang Ancestral Hall 鄧氏宗祠) by a 1 km trail.

Route: LRT Ping Shan stop, Hang Mei Tsuen stop or West Rail line Tin Shui Wai station

Tai Fu Tai
Tai Fu Tai Mansion in San Tin was probably built in 1865 in the reign of the Qing Dynasty. It is a richly embellished residence situated on a spacious ground, with a large open space in the front and a garden at the back. The whole compound is surrounded by a green-brick wall. It is a fine example of traditional Chinese dwellings of the scholar-gentry class and is certainly one of the most elegant buildings throughout the territory.

Route: KMB Bus 76K to San Tin

Tai Lam Country Park
Tai Lam Country Park sits in the western New Territories with an area of 54 km2. Tai Lam has a small area of porphyry in the northeast; for the remaining area, it is composed of highly erodible decomposed granite. In 1952, afforestation started as a measure to protect the water catchment area. In spite of the poor soil conditions and the setbacks of fire damage over the years, mature stands of Acacia confusa, Lophostemon confertus, Pinus massoniana, Pinus elliottii and Eucalyptus species now cover most of the area. In addition, the plantations also offer a good habitat for birds, pangolins, Chinese leopard cat, and barking deer. Nevertheless, Tai Lam is an excellent place for outdoor activities because of its remoteness.

Yuen Long Park

Yuen Long Park is a park at Yuen Long Town with recreational facilities. There is a 7-storey pagoda enclosing an aviary, which has become a landmark of Yuen Long.

Route: LRT Shui Pin Wai stop, LWB bus E34 or KMB Bus 68X, 268B, 268C, 268X, 269D, 276, 276P, B1, 68E (get off the bus at Yuen Long Park.)

Leisure and cultural facilities

 Yuen Long Theatre was opened in May 2000. This modern performing arts venue has become a centre for the arts in the New Territories northwest. The Theatre is situated at Yuen Long Tai Yuk Road in the vicinity of Yuen Long Park, Yuen Long Stadium and the Public Swimming Pool. The bamboo courtyard is a focus within the foyer, which creates an ambiance of serenity and tranquility.
 Yuen Long Town Hall is located in Kau Yuk Road, near Yuen Long Police Station. It is to organise courses and leisure activities. There is also study room.
 Yuen Long Swimming Pool is situated at Tai Yuk Road. There are 5 Standard swimming pools for four seasons.
 Tin Shui Wai Swimming Pool and Tin Shui Wai Sports Centre are situated at 1 Tin Pak Road. There are 3 swimming pools for four seasons and a children swimming pool opened during summer.
 Yuen Long Public Library is on the first floor of Yuen Long Government Offices, 2 Kiu Lok Square, Yuen Long.
 Ping Shan Tin Shui Wai Public Library is at Ping Shan Tin Shui Wai Leisure and Cultural Building, 1 Tsui Sing Road, Tin Shui Wai.
 TSW Pegasus and Yuen Long District SA are both football teams based in Yuen Long Stadium.

Transport

Located in the northwest of the New Territories, Yuen Long has a well-developed public transport network. It is easily accessible from different parts of Hong Kong by bus, mini-bus or railway.

 Bus services provided by Kowloon Motor Bus, Citybus and MTR
 Tuen Ma line and Light Rail services provided by MTR
 Public light buses
 Taxis, including the New Territories taxis (green taxis) and public taxis (public taxis).

The Hong Kong–Shenzhen Western Corridor bridge is the fourth cross-border route between Hong Kong and mainland China. It was completed and opened in 2007, and is 5.5 km long. It starts at Ngau Hom Shek, located at the northwest of Yuen Long, and ends in Shekou, a harbour port located in Shenzhen.

Education
 List of schools in Yuen Long District

Statistical information

See also
 List of places in Hong Kong
 Democratic Alliance
 Yuen Long Town

Footnotes

External links
 Yuen Long District Council
 List and map of electoral constituencies (large PDF file)
 Yuen Long New Town
 Tin Shui Wai New Town
 Yuen Long Theatre
 Yuen Long Town Hall
 Yuen Long New Town
 Hong Kong government pamphlet about the development of the new town
 Hong Kong Tourism Board
 WWF Hong Kong
 Hong Kong Wetland Park
 Yuen Long Special
 The incredible journey of Yuen Long